Alva was a range of cars made by Automobiles Alva, Courbevoie, Seine, France from 1913 to 1923. 

Some of the line-up of cars had 4-cylinder engines made by SCAP, while others had engines ranging from 1.5 to 2.2-litre capacity. They were conventional in design, aside from the Perrot 4-wheel brakes introduced in 1921, and some models that had an overhead cam engine.

References 
^ Georgano, G.N., "Alva", in G.N. Georgano, ed., The Complete Encyclopedia of Motorcars 1885-1968 (New York: E.P. Dutton and Co., 1974), pp.38.

Defunct motor vehicle manufacturers of France
Vintage vehicles
Cars introduced in 1913